Burklerk Pinsinchai (also written as Berklerk); is a former Muaythai practitioner from the 80s and 90s. He was a two time Lumpinee Stadium champion during the golden era of Muay Thai.

Biography and career
Burklerk was born in 1966 in the Buriram Province where his father initiated him to Muay Thai at the age of 9. In 1977 Burklerk moved to Bangkok to join the Pinsinchai camp owned by Lieutenant Savek Pinsinchai. He was initially too small to compete in Bangkok and fought mostly in Rangsit, Samrong and Chaophraya.

Burklerk emerged as a high level fighter in 1983 when he won his first Thailand title. By 1987 he was considered one of the best fighter in the country having won two Thailand titles and being the reigning Lumpinee Stadium 112 lbs champion. For his performance he was elected Lumpinee Fighter of the Year and received the "Yod Muay Fighter of the year" award. 

After losing his Lumpinee Stadium 112 lbs belt in 1987 Burklerk took a break of over 3 years in order to heal a chronic stomach disease. 

Burklerk made his comeback in 1991 and quickly regained his elite fighter status, he reached the final of the annual Isuzu Cup where he lost to Lakhin Wassandasit. He fought more sporadically during this second career but always with a high level of success against top opposition.

Following his retirement Burklerk became a trainer and in 2008 he opened his gym in Lampang. Burklerk gives seminars in various countries and was awarded "Muay Thai Ambassador of the Year" in 2010. His most successful student is Thepsutin Pumpanmuang (Thailand and Channel 7 champion).
	
Burklerk also tried himself at boxing having a single and only fight. He won by TKO against a debuting Filipino boxer, Jun Komer. He sent Komer down for an eight count in the second round and again at the beginning of the fifth round in an event at the Imperial World Lat Phrao, Bangkok on December 1, 2006.

Titles and accomplishments 
Lumpinee Stadium
 1984 Thailand Champion
 1986 Lumpinee Stadium 112 lbs Champion
 1986 Lumpinee Stadium Fighter of the Year
 1987 Lumpinee Stadium 112 lbs Champion

Rajadamnern Stadium
 1983 Thailand Champion
 1992 Isuzu Cup Runner-up

Fight record

|-  style="text-align:center; background:#cfc;"
| 1996-10-17 ||Win  ||align=left| Phongpayak Thammakasem || Lumpinee Stadium || Bangkok, Thailand || Decision || 5 ||3:00  

|-  style="text-align:center; background:#cfc;"
| 1996-06-06 ||Win  ||align=left| Phongpayak Thammakasem || Lumpinee Stadium || Bangkok, Thailand || Decision || 5 ||3:00  

|-  style="text-align:center; background:#cfc;"
| ? ||Win  ||align=left| Kompayak Porpramook ||  || Bangkok, Thailand || Decision || 5 ||3:00

|-  style="text-align:center; background:#fbb;"
| 1995-03-30 || Loss ||align=left| Kasemlek Kiatsiri || Rajadamnern Stadium || Bangkok, Thailand || KO ||2  ||

|-  style="text-align:center; background:#fbb;"
| 1994-11-30 || Loss ||align=left| Rotnarong Daopadriew || Rajadamnern Stadium || Bangkok, Thailand || KO (Right Cross) ||1  ||  
|-
! style=background:white colspan=9 |

|-  style="text-align:center; background:#cfc;"
| 1994-05-19 || Win ||align=left| Veeraphol Sahaprom || Rajadamnern Stadium || Bangkok, Thailand || Decision || 5 || 3:00 

|-  style="text-align:center; background:#cfc;"
| 1994-02-10 || Win ||align=left| Suktothai Taximeter || Rajadamnern Stadium || Bangkok, Thailand || Decision || 5 || 3:00 

|- style="text-align:center; background:#fbb;"
| 1993-12-13 || Loss ||align=left| Veeraphol Sahaprom || Rajadamnern Stadium  ||  Bangkok, Thailand  || KO (Punches)|| 2 ||   

|-  style="text-align:center; background:#fbb;"
| 1993-09-16 || Loss ||align=left| Dokmaipa Por Pongsawang || Rajadamnern Stadium || Bangkok, Thailand || Decision || 5 || 3:00

|-  style="text-align:center; background:#cfc"
| 1993-08-16 || Win ||align=left| Dokmaipa Por Pongsawang ||  || Thailand || Decision || 5 || 3:00

|-  style="text-align:center; background:#cfc;"
| 1993-05-17 || Win ||align=left| Tuktathong Por.Pongsawang || Rajadamnern Stadium || Bangkok, Thailand || KO (Right Cross)|| 4 || 

|-  style="text-align:center; background:#cfc;"
| 1993-03-08 || Win ||align=left| Veeraphol Sahaprom || Rajadamnern Stadium || Bangkok, Thailand || Decision || 5 || 3:00 

|-  style="text-align:center; background:#cfc;"
| 1993-01-26 || Win  ||align=left| Wichan Sitsuchon ||  || Bangkok, Thailand || Decision || 5 ||3:00  

|-  style="text-align:center; background:#fbb;"
| 1992-10-09 || Loss ||align=left| Saenklai Sit Kru Od || Lumpinee Stadium || Bangkok, Thailand || Decision || 5 ||3:00  

|-  style="text-align:center; background:#fbb;"
| 1992-03-19 || Loss ||align=left| Lakhin Wassandasit || Rajadamnern Stadium – Isuzu Tournament, Final|| Bangkok, Thailand || Decision  || 5 || 3:00 
|-
! style=background:white colspan=9 |

|-  style="text-align:center; background:#cfc;"
| 1991-10-03|| Win ||align=left| Dennua Denmolee || Rajadamnern Stadium – Isuzu Tournament|| Thailand || Decision || 5 ||3:00

|- style="text-align:center; background:#cfc;"
| 1991-09-19 || Win ||align=left| Veeraphol Sahaprom || Rajadamnern Stadium – Isuzu Tournament||  Bangkok, Thailand  || Decision || 5 || 3:00 

|-  style="text-align:center; background:#fbb;"
| 1991-08-15 || Loss ||align=left| Lakhin Wassandasit|| Rajadamnern Stadium – Isuzu Tournament|| Bangkok, Thailand || TKO (Punches) || 1 || 

|- style="text-align:center; background:#cfc;"
| 1991-04-27 || Win ||align=left| Deenun Tor.Pattanakit || ||  Pattaya, Thailand  || Decision || 5 || 3:00 

|-  style="text-align:center; background:#fbb;"
| 1987-08-28|| Loss||align=left| Dokmaipa Por Pongsawang || Lumpinee Stadium || Bangkok, Thailand || Decision || 5 || 3:00
|-
! style=background:white colspan=9 |

|-  style="text-align:center; background:#cfc;"
| 1987-07-24|| Win||align=left| Kwayrong Sit Samthahan || Lumpinee Stadium || Bangkok, Thailand || Decision || 5 || 3:00
|-
! style=background:white colspan=9 |

|-  style="text-align:center; background:#cfc;"
| 1987-05-19|| Win||align=left| Odnoi Lukprabat || Lumpinee Stadium || Bangkok, Thailand || Decision || 5 || 3:00

|-  style="text-align:center; background:#fbb;"
| 1987-02-06|| Loss ||align=left| Kwayrong Sit Samthahan || Lumpinee Stadium || Bangkok, Thailand || Decision || 5 ||3:00 
|-
! style=background:white colspan=9 |

|-  style="text-align:center; background:#cfc;"
| 1986-11-25|| Win||align=left| Paruhatlek Sitchunthong || Lumpinee Stadium || Bangkok, Thailand || Decision || 5 || 3:00
|-
! style=background:white colspan=9 |

|-  style="text-align:center; background:#cfc;"
| 1986-09-09|| Win||align=left| Odnoi Lukrabat  || Lumpinee Stadium || Bangkok, Thailand || Decision || 5 || 3:00
|-
! style=background:white colspan=9 |

|-  style="text-align:center; background:#cfc;"
| 1986–|| Win||align=left| Meeded Sitlaongchai  || || Rangsit, Thailand || KO || 1 ||

|-  style="text-align:center; background:#cfc;"
| 1986–|| Win||align=left| Morokot Chiangym  || Rajadamnern Stadium || Bangkok, Thailand || KO || 3 || 

|-  style="text-align:center; background:#cfc;"
| 1986–|| Win||align=left| Wiratnoi Kiatirataphon ||  || Hat Yai, Thailand || Decision || 5 || 3:00

|-  style="text-align:center; background:#c5d2ea;"
| 1986–|| Draw||align=left| Lookchai Sitchang || Rajadamnern Stadium || Bangkok, Thailand || Decision || 5 || 3:00

|-  style="text-align:center; background:#cfc;"
| 1986–|| Win||align=left| Kaosanit Sor Ploenchit || Lumpinee Stadium || Bangkok, Thailand || Decision || 5 || 3:00
|-

|-  style="text-align:center; background:#fbb;"
| 1985-11-12 || Loss||align=left| Morakot Chernyim || Lumpinee Stadium || Bangkok, Thailand || KO  || 4 ||  

|-  style="text-align:center; background:#fbb;"
| 1985-08-13|| Loss ||align=left| Ngoen Sor.Ploenchit || Lumpinee Stadium || Bangkok, Thailand || ||  || 

|-  style="text-align:center; background:#cfc;"
| 1985-06-15|| Win ||align=left| Samernoi Tor Boonlert|| Lumpinee Stadium || Bangkok, Thailand || Decision || 5 ||3:00
|-
! style=background:white colspan=9 |

|-  style="text-align:center; background:#cfc;"
| 1985–|| Win||align=left| Supernoi Sitchokechai ||  || Nakhon Si Thammarat, Thailand || Decision || 5 || 3:00

|-  style="text-align:center; background:#fbb;"
| 1984-10-08|| Loss ||align=left| Dennua Denmolee || Huamark Stadium || Thailand || Decision || 5 ||3:00

|-  style="text-align:center; background:#fbb;"
| 1984-09-12|| Loss ||align=left| Ngoen Sor.Ploenchit || Lumpinee Stadium || Bangkok, Thailand || Decision || 5 ||3:00

|-  style="text-align:center; background:#cfc;"
| 1984–|| Win ||align=left| Chutong Silapakorn|| Lumpinee Stadium || Bangkok, Thailand || Decision || 5 ||3:00
|-
! style=background:white colspan=9 |

|-  style="text-align:center; background:#cfc;"
| 1984–|| Win ||align=left| Jiawkinoi Nor Nongkaa|| Lumpinee Stadium || Bangkok, Thailand || Decision || 5 ||3:00
|-

|-  style="text-align:center; background:#cfc;"
| 1983–11-21|| Win ||align=left| Warunee Sor Ploenchit|| Rajadamnern Stadium || Bangkok, Thailand || Decision || 5 ||3:00
|-

|-  style="text-align:center; background:#cfc;"
| 1983–|| Win ||align=left| Sittichai Monsongkram || Rajadamnern Stadium || Bangkok, Thailand || Decision || 5 ||3:00
|-

|-  style="text-align:center; background:#cfc;"
| 1983–05-23|| Win ||align=left| Warunee Sor Ploenchit|| Rajadamnern Stadium || Bangkok, Thailand || Decision || 5 ||3:00
|-
! style=background:white colspan=9 |

|-  style="text-align:center; background:#cfc;"
| 1983–|| Win ||align=left| Ayrung Sitlerpan || Rajadamnern Stadium || Bangkok, Thailand || Decision || 5 ||3:00
|-
|-
| colspan=9 | Legend:

References

1966 births
Living people
Burklerk Pinsinchai
Burklerk Pinsinchai
Burklerk Pinsinchai
Muay Thai trainers